Edith Sara Watson (1861 in East Windsor Hill, Connecticut – 1943 in Florida) was a photographer whose career spanned the 1890s through the 1930s. She is best known for her photojournalistic images of everyday life, working people, and women, particularly in Canada.

Early life
Watson was the youngest of four children. Her family was involved in the newspaper business and also farmed tobacco. She and her sister, Amelia Watson, shared an interest in the art of watercolor painting, and at one point set out to become working artists by building their own studio. For about a decade, they traveled throughout New England, showing and selling their artwork. In the 1890s, when they went their separate ways, Watson started experimenting with the camera. Watson also studied photography with her uncle, botanist Sereno Watson.

Photography career

In 1896, Watson first traveled to Canada, and spent much of the next 35 years photographing rural people, often women, across the country. She sold her photographs to several North American newspapers and magazines; sometimes, she bartered her photographs to obtain lodging or supplies. Through these efforts, she maintained her independence and supported herself both as an artist and as a traveler.

For many years, she spent time during the winter in Bermuda, renting a cottage in St. George's, Bermuda and selling watercolors and hand-tinted photographs. In 1911, in Bermuda, Watson met journalist Victoria "Queenie" Hayward, who eventually became her partner in work and in life. The two women lived, worked, and traveled extensively together through isolated areas of Canada.

With her camera, Watson documented the lives of people in Newfoundland, Labrador, the Maritimes, Quebec, Ontario, and then westward into Manitoba and British Columbia, while Hayward wrote about them. The two women stayed with First Nations people in Quebec and Ontario; Mennonites, Doukhobors, and other "New Canadians" in Manitoba; and Haida people in British Columbia. In 1922, Watson and Hayward published Romantic Canada, an illustrated travelogue of their journeys across Canada. In it, Hayward coined the phrase "the Canadian mosaic" to describe the region's multiculturalism; the phrase and concept was picked up by subsequent thinkers and artists, including writer and cultural promoter John Murray Gibbon.

Photographs of Canadian women

Photographs of Bermuda

References

External links

Romantic Canada, by Victoria Hayward, illustrated with photographs by Edith S. Watson
Working Light: The Wandering Life of Photographer Edith S. Watson, by Frances Rooney

1861 births
1943 deaths
Canadian women photographers
Canadian lesbian artists
People from South Windsor, Connecticut
LGBT photographers
19th-century Canadian photographers
19th-century Canadian women artists
19th-century Canadian LGBT people
20th-century Canadian photographers
20th-century Canadian women artists
20th-century Canadian LGBT people
American emigrants to Canada